Boobs in the Woods is a 1950 Warner Bros. Looney Tunes cartoon, directed by Robert McKimson. The cartoon was released on January 28, 1950, and stars Daffy Duck and Porky Pig.

The cartoon is similar to the 1942 short My Favorite Duck.

Plot
Daffy is enjoying his "daffy" nature around the forest. Later, Porky pulls up and sets up camp to enjoy the countryside. He paints a landscape picture, briefly interrupted when Daffy poses. Taking a hint, Daffy rides off. Daffy then comes back in and tells Porky he may not paint "his" lakes, but the mountains are okay since he does not own them. Porky resumes painting, but "the old man of the mountains" comes—trying to get the mountains out of Porky's painting.

Porky sees through the disguise and tries to use a shotgun against Daffy, but a sheriff calls for an executioner. The sheriff walks out and the executioner appears with an axe. At the last moment, Porky is "saved" by Pocahontas. However, when "Cap'n John Smiff" does not agree to marry "her", Daffy starts making war whoops—until Porky shuts him up.

Porky then decides to try fishing, putting a bait attached to a bell. Daffy fools Porky twice by ringing the bell and Porky gets the better of Daffy by trying to chop him with an axe, but Daffy then rings his own bell—only to be surprised when Porky does catch a large fish. Daffy then asks about the various licenses Porky has until Porky says he does not have a marriage license. Porky responds by throwing a rock at Daffy, but Daffy makes out like they are in a baseball game, and encourages Porky as Joe DiMaggio to slide for home. Porky realizes too late that he is not really DiMaggio and lands in a mud puddle ("My name is Mud," Porky says).

Porky then starts packing up his trailer to get away from Daffy and avoid going insane. Daffy climbs into Porky's engine, deliberately throws out the engine and closes the hood. Porky tries starting the car, but gets Daffy's stalled motor sound. When Daffy makes the sound while Porky is out of the car, Porky jumps in, makes some "adjustments", then climbs back in the car. Having finally gotten the better of the duck, Porky starts the car again, pulling on the 'choke' lever, which causes a mechanical arm to pop out and choke Daffy, who is now wired into the car and is powering it. Daffy mentions that Porky has absolutely no right to do this, until a license appears, showing that Porky has a license to use Daffy as a motor.

Cast
Mel Blanc as Daffy Duck and Porky Pig

Home media
Boobs in the Woods can be found, restored and uncut, in the Looney Tunes Golden Collection: Volume 1.

See also
List of Daffy Duck cartoons
List of Porky Pig cartoons

Notes
The song Daffy sings at the beginning ("Oh, People Call Me Daffy") bears incredible resemblance to the first song Groucho Marx sings as Rufus T. Firefly in the 1933 film Duck Soup.
Daffy's quote at the end, "What a revoltin' development this is," is a catchphrase used by William Bendix on the radio program, The Life of Riley.

References

External links

 

1950 animated films
1950 short films
1950 films
Looney Tunes shorts
Warner Bros. Cartoons animated short films
Films directed by Robert McKimson
Daffy Duck films
Porky Pig films
1950s Warner Bros. animated short films
Films scored by Carl Stalling
1950s English-language films
Films set in forests
Cultural depictions of Pocahontas